Vidyadhar Karmakar (1925 – 20 September 2021) was an Indian stage, film and television actor. He played in many advertisements from 2006 on.

Career 
Vidyadhar retired from the Central Telegraph office in 1984. Before he started modelling in ads he was known face in Marathi theatre. He acted in and also directed plays. In addition he was a puppeteer.

Filmography

Films

Television

References

Links 
 Vidyadhar Karmarkar is the oldest actor on Indian television
 

1925 births
2021 deaths
Indian male film actors
20th-century Indian male actors
21st-century Indian male actors